The Oostkerk is a Protestant church in Middelburg. The church can be spotted on the Middelburg horizon by its characteristic round dome.

History

After Drijfhout died in 1651, the building was continued under the Leiden architect , who had just completed the Marekerk in Leiden. The white organ was built by Gebr. de Rijckere from Kortrijk in 1782.

See also
Other 17th century "round" churches of the Netherlands:
 Marekerk, round church of Leiden
 Ronde Lutherse Kerk, round church of Amsterdam

References

External links

Churches in Zeeland
Buildings and structures in Middelburg, Zeeland
Rijksmonuments in Middelburg, Zeeland
Churches completed in 1667
17th-century Protestant churches
Octagonal churches
1667 establishments in the Dutch Republic